Pennsylvania Run Presbyterian Church is a historic church near Okolona, Kentucky.  It was built in 1840 and added to the National Register of Historic Places in 1983.  It was then named Smyrna Missionary Baptist Church.

The church was organized in 1799.  A log building was replaced by its 1840 building, which is a one-room frame building with a gable roof.  It has a one-story square tower with steeple and an open belfry.

References

Churches in Louisville, Kentucky
Presbyterian churches in Kentucky
Local landmarks in Louisville, Kentucky
National Register of Historic Places in Louisville, Kentucky
Churches on the National Register of Historic Places in Kentucky
Churches completed in 1840
19th-century buildings and structures in Louisville, Kentucky
1840 establishments in Kentucky
Baptist churches in Kentucky